Bhanu Chander (Madduri Venkatasatya Subramanyeswara Bhanuchander Prasad; born 2 July 1952) is an Indian actor, director and producer known for his works predominantly in Telugu and Tamil cinema. He is the son of veteran music composer Master Venu. His paternal family hails from Machilipatnam and maternal family hails from Rajahmundry. He was born near Madras. He is known for his association with directors like K. Viswanath, Balu Mahendra, B. Narsing Rao, and K. Balachander. In 1990, he starred in Sutradharulu, which won the National Film Award for Best Feature Film in Telugu for that year.

Filmography

Telugu

Tamil

Teleserials 
 1991 Penn
 1990s Kalloori Kalam
 1990s Sorgam
 2000 Micro Thodargal- Mounam Oru Bashai
 2004–2005 Engiruntho Vandhaal
 2006–2008 Kana Kaanum Kaalangal
 2012 Karthigai Pengal

References 

1952 births
Living people
Telugu people
Male actors in Tamil cinema
Male actors in Telugu cinema
Indian male film actors
Tamil male television actors
Television personalities from Tamil Nadu
Male actors from Andhra Pradesh
20th-century Indian male actors
21st-century Indian male actors